Trevor John Hedge (born 3 August 1943 in Diss, Norfolk, England) is a former international speedway rider who reached the final of the
Speedway World Championship in 1970. He also won the London Riders' Championship twice in succession in 1969 and 1970, and won the prestigious W.D & H.O Wills Internationale in 1969.

Before taking up speedway, Hedge was a cycle speedway champion.

World Final Appearances
 1970 -  Wroclaw, Olympic Stadium - 16th - 0pts

References

External links
www.hackneyhawks.co.uk

1943 births
Living people
British speedway riders
English motorcycle racers
Hackney Hawks riders
Wimbledon Dons riders
King's Lynn Stars riders
Norwich Stars riders
Oxford Cheetahs riders
Leicester Hunters riders
People from Diss, Norfolk